Atys is a genus of very small to medium-sized sea snails, marine opisthobranch gastropod mollusks in the family Haminoeidae.

All the species within the genus Atys are herbivores. They occur in tropical and warm oceans and seas. They are cephalaspideans, part of the suborder of headshield slugs and bubble snails.

The genus was named after Atys, a king of Alba Longa, who was mentioned in ancient Greek texts.

Description
These snails have a shell which is very lightweight and translucent, with a sunken spire. The shape of the shell in some species resembles a bubble, and because of this, species in this genus are commonly known as Atys bubble shells or Atys bubble snails. (Several other shelled families within the Cephalaspidea are even more commonly known as "bubble shells" or "bubble snails", for example, the Bullidae.)

The anatomy of the soft parts of most species within this genus has not been studied, but it seems that some of the species in this genus can not reliably be discriminated on the basis of shell characters alone. Unfortunately however, a considerable number of the species were originally named from empty shells, and as a result, their exact identity may be problematic.

Species
Species within the genus Atys include:
 Atys alayoi Espinosa, Fernandez-Garcès & Ortea, 2004
Atys angustatus Smith, 1972
Atys beberkiriana Martin, 1906
 Atys bicolor Bozzetti, 2009
Atys blainvilliana Récluz, 1843 (nomen dubium - probably a synonym of Atys jeffreysi)
Distribution : Mediterranean, Turkey
Atys brocchii Michelotti, 1847
Distribution : Mediterranean, Turkey
Atys caribaeus d'Orbigny, 1841 Also known as Caribbean glassy-bubble, Sharp’s paper-bubble
Distribution : Florida, Caribbean, Brazil, Western Atlantic Ocean.
Length : 11 mm
Description : found at depths up to 183 m; small ovate white shell, narrowing toward the apex; sunken spire; body whorl has spiral grooves at the edges; narrow aperture
Atys castus Carpenter, 1864 clean glassy-bubble
Distribution : Baja California, Mexico
Length : 10 mm
Atys chelidon Melvill, 1912
Atys cheverti Brazier, 1879
Atys chimera Baker & Hanna, 1927
Distribution : Baja California, Mexico
Length : 7 mm
Atys constrictus Habe, 1952
Atys convexa Preston, 1908
Atys costulosa Pease, 1869
Atys curta A. Adams, 1850 striate bubble
 Atys cylindraeus (Helbling, 1779)
Atys cylindrica Hinds, 1779
Distribution : Indo-Pacific
Length : 30 mm
Description : Thin, fragile, subcylindrical shell with sunken apex. Color is white or very light brown. it may have a few brown axial lines.
Atys dactylus Hedley, 1899
Atys darnleyensis Brazier, 1879
Atys debilis Pease, 1871
Distribution : Hawaii
Length : 10 mm
Description : on sandy bottoms where they burrow through the sand with their flattened headshield for food like small crustaceans.
Atys dubiosa Brazier, 1879
Atys ehrenbergi A. Issel, 1869 (possibly = Atys naucum)
Distribution : Red Sea
Length : 11 mm
Atys flavovirens Melvill & Standen, 1903
Atys fukuokaensis Habe
Distribution: Japan
Atys guildingi Sowerby II, 1869 Guildin’s atys
Distribution: Mexico, Costa Rica, Panama, Venezuela, Brazil
Length : 12 mm
Description : found at depths up to 25 m
Atys hyalinus Watson, 1883
Atys jeffreysi Weinkauff, 1868
Distribution : Canary Islands, Madeira, Azores, Mediterranean
Atys kekele Pilsbry, 1920
Atys kuhnsi Pilsbry, 1917
Atys liriope Hertlein & Strong, 1951
Distribution : California, Mexico
Length : 10 mm
Atys lithiensis Sturany, 1903
Atys macandrawii E. A. Smith, 1872
Distribution : Caribbean, Brazil, Eastern Atlantic Ocean, Azores, Canaries, Cape Verde Islands
Length : 7.3 mm
Description : found at depths of up to 75 m
Atys mirandae Smith, 1872
Atys multistriata Schepman, 1913
Distribution : Micronesia, Philippines
Length : 12 mm
Description : short headshield, broadened anteriorly, with internal black eyes. Short posterior lobes. Triangulate parapodia cover the anterior of the shell; short, rounded tail; The translucent Hancock’s organs appear as a thin low profile ridge. Translucent white animal with brown spots and clusters of opaque white dots; thin, elongate, ovoid shell; inner margin of the outer lip extends above the apex; slightly curved columella; deep umbilicus behind the fold
Atys muscaria Gould, 1859
Atys naucum Linnaeus, 1758 white nut sheath bubble, Pacific nut sheath bubble
Distribution : Indo-Pacific (excluding the Red Sea), Australia
Length : 22–50 mm
Description : common species; light brown inflated bubble shell;: the brown color comes from the periostracum, covering the shell; this flakes off when the snail dies; juveniles have lengthwise brown wavy lines on the shell.
 Atys neglectus Preston, 1908 *
Atys nonscriptus clean-slate glassy-bubble
Atys obscuratus Dall, 1896 obscure glassy-bubble
Distribution : North Carolina
Length : 4 mm
Atys okamotoi Habe, 1952
Atys pacei Preston, 1908
Atys palmarum Hedley, 1912
Atys porcellana Gould, 1859
Atys pransa Hedley, 1904
Atys pulchra Brazier, 1879
Atys reliquua Iredale, 1936
Atys riiseanus Mörch, 1875
Distribution : Florida, Caribbean, Brazil
Length : 13 mm
Description : found at depths up to 90 m
Atys sandersoni Dall, 1881
Distribution : North Carolina, Cuba, Panama, Brazil
Length : 8 mm
Atys scrobiculata A. Adams, 1862
Atys semistriata Pease, 1860 variably banded atys, variable banded bubble
Distribution : West Pacific
Length : 6 mm
Atys submalleata Smith, 1904
Atys supracancellata Schepman, 1913: synonym of Sabatia supracancellata (Schepman, 1913)
Atys vixumbilicata Preston, 1908
Atys xarifae Marcus, 1959

References

Books
 Redfern, Colin, 2001, Bahamian Seashells, a thousand species from Abaco, Bahamas, published by BahamianSeashells.com Inc

External links

Haminoeidae
Gastropod genera